Bad Judge is an American legal sitcom television series co-created by Chad Kultgen and Anne Heche. Kultgen and Heche also serve as executive producers, along with Will Ferrell, Kate Walsh, Adam McKay, Chris Henchy, Betsy Thomas, and Jill Sobel Messick for Universal Television.

The series premiered on NBC on October 2, 2014. NBC canceled the series on October 31, 2014; however, the network aired the full series 13-episode order. The series finale aired on January 22, 2015.

Plot
The series chronicles the personal life (and wild lifestyle) of Rebecca Wright, a tough-as-nails judge serving on the Los Angeles County Circuit Court, whose time off the bench is spent partying and displaying reckless behavior.

Cast
Kate Walsh as Judge Rebecca Wright
Ryan Hansen as Dr. Gary Boyd
John Ducey as Tom Barlow
Tone Bell as Tedward Mulray
Miguel Sandoval as Judge Hernandez
Amy Rhodes as Judy

Reception
Bad Judge has received mostly negative reviews. On Rotten Tomatoes, the show holds a rating of 20%, based on 39 reviews, with an average rating of 4.5/10. The site's consensus reads, "A  alleged comedy charged with minimal wit, Bad Judge is benched by stale jokes and a lead performance that lacks conviction." On Metacritic, the show has a score of 38 out of 100, based on 22 critics, indicating "generally unfavorable reviews".

The show also received criticism from the Miami-Dade chapter of the Florida Association for Women Lawyers, which asked NBC to cancel the series. Deborah Baker, president of the chapter, was quoted as saying, "The show is not only offensive to the many women judges who serve with the highest levels of integrity but also dangerous to the extent those who hold preconceived notions about women judges will find their sexist beliefs reaffirmed."

Episodes

Ratings

Accolades
Bad Judge was nominated for a People's Choice Award for Favorite New TV Comedy.

References

External links
 
 

2014 American television series debuts
2015 American television series endings
2010s American single-camera sitcoms
English-language television shows
2010s American legal television series
2010s American workplace comedy television series
NBC original programming
Television series by Gary Sanchez Productions
Television series by Universal Television
Television shows set in Los Angeles
Court shows